The 1981 John Player Special Formula 1 World Series was the inaugural season of Formula 1 Powerboat racing. Representing the 'OZ' racing class of the period, the championship was formed as a consequence of a difference of opinion between the leading figures in powerboat racing at the time, and was heavily supported by both John Player and engine manufacturer Outboard Marine Corporation, whose Johnson and Evinrude branded engines were used by the entire field. Whilst the series was designed to showcase the firm's huge 3.5 litre V8 engines, the very first race saw all boats using smaller V6 units and only six drivers would be given the V8 engines for the remainder of the year.

Renato Molinari was the series' first ever champion, winning four of the five races he contested. In total, six races made up the 1981 world championship, beginning in Como, Italy and ending in Den Bosch, Netherlands. An additional non-championship invitational race, the British Grand Prix, was also held at Chasewater.

Series Formation

Teams and drivers

Season calendar

 The British round of the championship was known as the John Player Grand Prix for sponsorship reasons.

Non-championship events

Results and standings
Points were awarded to the top six finishers based on the aggregated results of between one and four heat races during the event. Any drivers below sixth place were not classified (NC).

Drivers standings

References

External links
 The official website of the UIM F1 H2O World Championship
 The official website of the Union Internationale Motonautique

F1 Powerboat World Championship
Formula 1 Powerboat seasons
F1 Powerboat World Championship